The Tooth Will Out is a 1951 short subject directed by Edward Bernds starring American slapstick comedy team The Three Stooges (Moe Howard, Larry Fine and Shemp Howard). It is the 134th entry in the series released by Columbia Pictures starring the comedians, who released 190 shorts for the studio between 1934 and 1959.

Plot
After being fired from two jobs for breaking dishes, the Stooges end up being chased into a dental office by the angry Vesuvius restaurant chef with a cleaver. Eventually, the boys study, and graduate from dental school. The dean of the school (Vernon Dent) gives them their first recommendation to go out west (read: far away), and open a practice.

The boys open up shop in quiet western town, when their first customer (Slim Gaut) comes in with a mild toothache. Wearing glasses with lenses as thick as soda bottles, Dr. Shemp proceeds to drill the patient's teeth until smoke rises from his mouth.

The appointment is abruptly cut short when an irate customer who claims to be the Sheriff (Dick Curtis) enters the office with a serious toothache. Feeling nervous, Shemp accidentally picks up the wrong book, entitled The Amateur Carpenter. They first rub sandpaper to his chest, and paste the inside of his hat which they thought it was to "varnish the lid". After discovering it is the wrong book, the boys go back to business seriously. They finally extract the Sheriff's tooth, only to discover it is the wrong one that Shemp pulled out and runs out of the Dentist's office.

Cast
 Moe Howard as Moe
 Larry Fine as Larry
 Shemp Howard as Shemp
 Vernon Dent as Dr. Keefer, Professor of Dentistry
 Margie Liszt as Miss Beebe, Dr. Keefer's assistant
 Dick Curtis as the town sheriff (second patient)
 Slim Gaut as first patient
 Emil Sitka as Vesuvius chef

Production notes
The Tooth Will Out was filmed on February 19–20, 1951. The film's title parodies the proverbial expression "The truth will out."

The second half of this film, consisting of the dentist office scene, was originally filmed seven months earlier in June 1950 for inclusion in the previous entry, Merry Mavericks. However, the scene ran too long and had to be excised from the final cut. Rather than disposing of the surplus dentist footage, the story line of The Tooth Will Out was built around it.

This was the last film to feature longtime Stooge supporting actor, the late Dick Curtis, who died of pneumonia brought on by lung cancer in January 1952. The voice from the living set of dentures is Vernon Dent.

References

External links 
 
 

1951 films
1950s Western (genre) comedy films
1951 short films
The Three Stooges films
American black-and-white films
Films about dentistry
Films directed by Edward Bernds
Columbia Pictures short films
1951 comedy films
1950s English-language films
1950s American films